Ignatius of Jesus (born Carlo Leonelli; 1596, Sorbolongo, Pesaro – 21 February 1667, Rome) was an Italian Roman Catholic friar of the Order of the Discalced Carmelites who served as a missionary in Persia, Basra, and Lebanon for 35 years. He is best known for writing the first Western scholarly work on Mandaeism, Narratio originis, rituum, & errorum christianorum Sancti Ioannis ("Narration of the Origin, the Rituals, and the Errors of the Christians of St. John") (1652).

Biography
1596, Carlo Leonelli was born as the fifth of sixth siblings to a semi-noble family in Sorbolongo.

He joined the Discalced Carmelites (also known as the "Barefoot" Carmelites) and took his vows on 27 February 1623, receiving the name of Ignatius of Jesus.

He spent 35 years from 1629 to 1664 as a missionary in the Middle East in the following locations.

1629–1634: Isfahan
1634–1641: Shiraz
1641–1652: Basra
1652–1664: Lebanon

He died in Rome on 21 February 1667.

Works
Ignatius of Jesus is best known for his 1652 treatise on Mandaeism, Narratio originis, rituum, & errorum christianorum Sancti Ioannis ("Narration of the Origin, the Rituals, and the Errors of the Christians of St. John").

His other works include Grammatica linguae persicae (1661), a grammar of the Persian language.

References

External links
Narratio originis, rituum, & errorum christianorum Sancti Ioannis on Google Books
Grammatica linguae Persicae on Google Books

1596 births
1667 deaths
Discalced Carmelites
Missionary linguists
Roman Catholic missionaries in Iran
Roman Catholic missionaries in Iraq
Italian Roman Catholic missionaries
Scholars of Mandaeism
People from the Province of Pesaro and Urbino